The Evil of the Daleks is the mostly-missing ninth and final serial of the fourth season in the British science fiction television series Doctor Who, which originally aired in seven weekly parts from 20 May to 1 July 1967.

In this serial, the Doctor (Patrick Troughton) and his travelling companion Jamie (Frazer Hines), shortly after losing the TARDIS, are transported to 1866, where the Daleks force the Doctor to help them in their latest plot to implement the human factor into Dalek brains in order to 'humanise' themselves into even deadlier living weapons. This serial marked the debut of Deborah Watling as the Doctor's new companion, Victoria Waterfield. It is also notable for introducing the Dalek Emperor. Only episode two, the episode in which Victoria first appears, is held in the BBC archives; the other six remain missing.

This story was initially intended to be the last Dalek story on Doctor Who. Writer Terry Nation, the creator of the Daleks, was trying to sell the Daleks to American television at the time and it was intended to give them a big send-off from the series. However, this was not to be the Doctor's last encounter with them. Aside from a few cameos, the Daleks did not properly return to the series until Day of the Daleks in 1972. In 1993, readers of DreamWatch Bulletin voted The Evil of the Daleks as the best ever Doctor Who story in a special poll for the series' thirtieth anniversary.

The story was released on DVD and Blu-ray in animated form on 27 September 2021, with the remaining episode two included.

Plot

In 1966 London, the Second Doctor and Jamie watch helplessly as the TARDIS is loaded onto a lorry and driven away from Gatwick Airport. The trail leads them to an antique shop run by Edward Waterfield, who sells Victorian-style antiques that curiously seem as though they were still new. Waterfield is being coerced by the Daleks, who appear in a secret room of his shop through a time machine, and exterminate his mutinous employee Kennedy.  Investigating the store, the Doctor and Jamie succumb to a booby trap that gasses them, and are dragged into the time machine by Waterfield.

They wake to find that they have been transported to 1866, and are in the house of Theodore Maxtible, Waterfield's partner. The two had been trying to invent a time machine using mirrors and static electricity, when the Daleks emerged from their time cabinet. The Daleks then took Waterfield's daughter, Victoria Waterfield, hostage and forced Waterfield to travel a century forward in time to lure the Doctor into a trap by stealing the TARDIS. Waterfield is obviously fearful for his daughter's safety and his own, but Maxtible seems to be cooperating with the Daleks.

The Daleks threaten to destroy the TARDIS unless the Doctor helps them by conducting an experiment to isolate the "Human Factor", the unique qualities of human beings that have allowed them to consistently resist and defeat the Daleks. Once the Doctor has isolated the Human Factor, he will implant it into three Daleks, who will then become the precursors of a race of "super" Daleks, with the best qualities of humans and Daleks. To that end the Daleks want the Doctor to test Jamie by sending him to rescue Victoria, who is being kept in the house. The Doctor is strangely cooperative with the Daleks, manipulating Jamie into the rescue mission but not telling him of the nature of the test.

Jamie rescues Victoria, but she is taken prisoner again and transported through the time cabinet. The Doctor, observing how Jamie accomplished the rescue, distils the Human Factor, but suspects that there is more to the experiment than just this. Once the Human Factor is implanted in the three Daleks, they become completely human in personality and seem almost childlike, although the Doctor says their mentalities will mature quickly. This was the Doctor's intent all along: that the human factor would lead to "human" Daleks that would be friendly to humanity. He christens the three Alpha, Beta and Omega, but they soon return through the time cabinet to Skaro, the Daleks' home planet.

Waterfield discovers that Maxtible has betrayed them all to the Daleks, hoping that he will be able to learn the alchemical secret of transmuting base metals into gold. However, Maxtible, who has travelled to Skaro through the mirror cabinet, is discovering just how ruthless the Daleks are and how empty their promises can be; he is tortured for his failure to bring the Doctor to them. Jamie, Waterfield and the Doctor are locked out of the time cabinet, but manage to use the Daleks' own short-range time machine to make the journey to Skaro before a Dalek bomb destroys Maxtible's house.

The trio find their way into the Dalek city and are brought before the imposing Dalek Emperor, who reveals the true reason behind the experiments and the capture of the TARDIS: by isolating the human factor, the Doctor has succeeded in isolating the "Dalek Factor" as well. The Daleks will use the "Dalek Factor"—the qualities that make the Daleks relentless killing machines—to reconvert the "human" Daleks. In addition, the Emperor wants the Doctor to use the TARDIS to spread the Dalek Factor throughout human history, turning all humanity into Daleks. The Doctor knows that the Emperor realises that he would die before complying with this order, and so is concerned about why the Emperor seems so confident.

Maxtible is tricked into walking through an archway that infuses him with the Dalek Factor, mentally turning him into a Dalek. He hypnotises the Doctor and lures him through the arch as well, apparently converting him. However, the Doctor is feigning his conversion and secretly plants a device on the arch while the Daleks hunt for the three "human" Daleks. As one still remains to be found, the Doctor suggests that all the Daleks be put through the conversion arch so that the "human" Dalek will once again be infused with the Dalek Factor.

As the first batch of Daleks go through the arch, the Doctor frees the others. The arch did not work on the Doctor because it was calibrated for humans, and he is not one. The Doctor has also substituted the Human Factor for the Dalek Factor on the arch, so the Daleks that go through will become "human" and rebel against the Emperor. The Emperor calls out his Black Daleks as the rebellion spreads and the City falls into chaos. Waterfield throws himself in front of a Black Dalek blast meant for the Doctor; the Doctor promises that Victoria will be taken care of, and Waterfield dies content. The Emperor is attacked by the "human" Daleks.

While the Doctor and his companions escape, Maxtible rushes back into the exploding city, screaming of the everlasting glory of the Dalek race. 
The Doctor tells Jamie that they will be taking the now-orphaned Victoria along on their travels. Jamie, Victoria and the Doctor watch the Dalek City in flames from the top of a hill as the civil war continues. The Doctor pronounces this the end of the Daleks – the final end. However a pulsating light is seen coming from the Emperor, indicating that the Dalek is still alive.

Production

Cast notes
Patrick Troughton only appears in pre-filmed insert scenes for the fourth episode, as he was on holiday. Likewise Deborah Watling only appears in a pre-filmed scene in episode four. John Bailey, who played Edward Waterfield, had previously appeared in The Sensorites, and would later appear in The Horns of Nimon.

According to the short BBC Video documentary The Dalek Factor about the making of the story, released in September 2021 as part of the animated restoration of the serial, Denise Buckley was cast in the role of Victoria Waterfield by director Derek Martinus. The production team had been hoping that Pauline Collins would continue in the role of Samantha Briggs, that she had played in the previous story The Faceless Ones, but had created Victoria as a back-up should Collins decline. When Collins confirmed she did not want to join the regular cast, it was decided to introduce Victoria as the new companion and Denise Buckley was released, but paid in full, with Deborah Watling replacing her as a more suitable actress for the ongoing role.

Missing episodes
This story was wiped from the BBC's archives in the late 1960s. Episodes 1 to 6 were wiped in August 1968, and episode 7 was wiped in September 1969. Only episode 2 remains, in a telerecording found at a car boot sale then returned to the archive in May 1987.

In 2004, analysis of the repeated clip used in The Wheel in Space episode six revealed it to be from episode one rather than episode two, as had been long believed. This, however, only constitutes a few frames of recovered footage. The discovery of a behind-the-scenes film, The Last Dalek, made by the special effects team as they worked on the story's conclusion, facilitated a recreation of the climactic battle scenes. This recreation, along with the entire film, have been made available in different forms on various Troughton releases, and has often been used to fill in for the missing climax of Episode 7 in fan-made reconstructions, to give fans an idea of what it looked like when it first aired. In addition, tele-snaps and off-air audio recordings made by fans upon the original broadcasts exist for the entire story.

Broadcast and reception

 Episode is missing

The story was repeated in 1968 at the end of Season 5 (8 June 1968 to 22 June 1968 and 13 July 1968 to 3 August 1968 allowing for a two-week break for coverage of the 1968 Wimbledon tennis championships) at 5.15pm. At the end of The Wheel in Space, the Doctor used a telepathic display machine to show new companion Zoe Heriot the sort of monsters she would face if she joined the TARDIS crew, and shows a clip from the end of episode 1 of The Evil of the Daleks. Over the following weeks (bridging the gap between Seasons 5 and 6) the entire story was shown, narration over the opening scene of episode 1 reminding viewers of the reason for the repeat. This was the only time any Doctor Who episodes (other than the first episode) were reshown in the 1960s. The repeat viewing figures were 6.3, 5.0, 6.3, 5.0, 5.1, 4.5, 5.2 million viewers respectively. Ironically, Zoe herself would never encounter the Daleks on television; decades later, the Big Finish Productions audio story Fear of the Daleks would tell of an encounter between Zoe and the Daleks, set immediately after the Doctor's telepathic re-run.

Paul Cornell, Martin Day, and Keith Topping gave the serial a positive review in The Discontinuity Guide (1995), describing it as "a grandiose production which papers over its scientifically implausible aspects with a confident swagger." In The Television Companion (1998), David J. Howe and Stephen James Walker noted how The Evil of the Daleks paid tribute to the series' past, and praised Whitaker's writing and the production values. In 2009, Patrick Mulkern of Radio Times awarded it five stars out of five and wrote that the story "boasts an intriguing mystery, well-drawn characters, atmospheric settings and thrilling set-pieces", though it did have an "overly elaborate" plot. He particularly praised Jamie, as well as the incidental music.

Broadcast of recreation
The animated reconstruction mentioned under Home Media was shown on BBC America on Saturday, October 30, 2021, from 8 AM to 11:30 AM, the day before the release of The Halloween Apocalypse (Extended Cut), the first story of the 13th Series of New Who.

On stage
In 2006 the BBC and the Terry Nation estate licensed a charity stage version of the serial. It was adapted and directed by Nick Scovell, who also starred as the Doctor. Production was by Rob Thrush, who provided the Dalek voices, and the orchestral score was by Martin Johnson. The production ran at the New Theatre Royal, Portsmouth between 25 and 28 October 2006, playing to sell-out houses during its five-night run. £15,000 was raised towards the restoration of the theatre, with an additional £550 going to Children in Need.

Commercial releases

In print

Virgin Books published a novelisation of this serial by John Peel in August 1993. It was the last serial of the original series to be novelised under the Target Books banner.  Afterwards, only five serials (The Pirate Planet, City of Death, Shada, Resurrection of the Daleks and Revelation of the Daleks), due to complex licensing, remained unavailable for adaptation. All five were finally novelised by James Goss, Gareth Roberts and Eric Saward respectively, for BBC Books in the 2010s. All were subsequently re-published, in abridged form, under BBC Books' own relaunched Target branding.

Home media

As with all missing episodes, off-air recordings of the soundtrack exist due to contemporary fan efforts. In 1992 a set was released on audiocassette, accompanied by linking narration from the Fourth Doctor, Tom Baker. However, due to problems with background music clearance the scenes set in the Tricolour in episode one had to be deleted. Subsequently, better quality copies of the soundtrack emerged and in 2003, the remastered soundtrack was re-released with the excised scenes restored (albeit with the song "Paperback Writer" changed to "Hold Tight!") and with new narration by Frazer Hines. This CD release contains bonus tracks featuring the end of Episode 7 without narration, raw dialogue and sound effect recordings and the narrated opening to Episode 1 from the 1968 repeat.

The serial was originally released on CD in the Doctor Who: Daleks collector's tin, alongside the soundtrack to The Power of the Daleks and a bonus disc featuring My Life as a Dalek, a historical documentary presented by Mark Gatiss; it was re-issued individually in 2004. Hines' narrated version was released on vinyl by Demon Music Group on 19 July 2019. To promote the vinyl release, an exclusive EP of the CD's bonus tracks was bundled with the "Deluxe Edition" of Doctor Who Magazine issue 539.

In 1992, the sole surviving episode was featured in the Daleks: The Early Years VHS. In November 2004, the same episode was released on DVD as part of the Lost in Time box set.

The story was released on DVD and Blu-ray on 27 September 2021, with all seven episodes animated in both colour and black-and-white, with the surviving Episode 2 also included.

References

Bibliography

External links

Photonovel of The Evil of the Daleks on the BBC website
Doctor Who Locations – The Evil of the Daleks

Target novelisation

1967 British television episodes
Dalek television stories
Doctor Who missing episodes
Doctor Who pseudohistorical serials
Doctor Who stories set on Earth
Fiction set in 1866
Fiction set in 1966
Second Doctor serials
Television episodes set in London
Victorian era in popular culture
Television episodes set in the 1860s